This article lists various football records and statistics of the Italy national football team.

Honours
 FIFA World Cup
 Winners (4): 1934, 1938, 1982, 2006
 Runners-up (2): 1970, 1994
 Third place (1): 1990
 Fourth place (1): 1978
 UEFA European Championship
 Winners (2): 1968, 2020
 Runners-up (2): 2000, 2012
 Fourth place (1): 1980
 Semi-finals (1): 1988
 FIFA Confederations Cup
 Third place (1): 2013
 UEFA Nations League
 Third place (1): 2020–21
 Olympic football tournament
 Gold Medal (1): 1936
 Bronze Medal (2): 1928, 2004
 Central European International Cup
 Winners (2): 1927–30, 1933–35
 Runners-up (2): 1931–32, 1936–38
 CONMEBOL–UEFA Cup of Champions
 Runners-up (1): 2022

Individual records

Players

Appearances

 Most appearances 
As of 20 November 2022, the players with the most appearances for Italy are:

Players in bold are still active.

FIFA World Cup
 Most appearances at the FIFA World Cup
 Paolo Maldini, 23
 Most appearances at the FIFA World Cup qualifiers
 Gianluigi Buffon, 39
 Most appearances at the FIFA World Cup and FIFA World Cup qualifiers
 Fabio Cannavaro, 50
 Most minutes played in FIFA World Cup matches
 Paolo Maldini, 2,216 minutes
 Most FIFA World Cups part of the squad
 Gianluigi Buffon (1998, 2002, 2006, 2010, 2014), 5
 Most FIFA World Cups played in
 Gianluigi Buffon, Gianni Rivera, Giuseppe Bergomi, Paolo Maldini and Fabio Cannavaro, 4 each

UEFA European Championship
 Most appearances at the UEFA European Championship
 Leonardo Bonucci, 18
 Most appearances in UEFA European Championship qualifying
 Gianluigi Buffon, 41
 Most appearances at the UEFA European Championship and UEFA European Championship qualifying
 Gianluigi Buffon, 58
 Most minutes played in European Championship matches
 Leonardo Bonucci, 1,668 minutes
 Most European Championships part of the squad
 Alessandro Del Piero (1996, 2000, 2004, 2008), Gianluigi Buffon (2004, 2008, 2012, 2016) and Giorgio Chiellini (2008, 2012, 2016, 2020), 4
 Most UEFA European Championships played in
 Gianluigi Buffon, Alessandro Del Piero and Giorgio Chiellini, 4

UEFA Nations League
 Most appearances in the UEFA Nations League
 Gianluigi Donnarumma, 18

FIFA Confederations Cup
 Most appearances at the FIFA Confederations Cup
 Gianluigi Buffon, Giorgio Chiellini and Riccardo Montolivo, 8 each
 Most FIFA Confederations Cups played in
 Gianluigi Buffon, Giorgio Chiellini, Daniele De Rossi, Andrea Pirlo, Riccardo Montolivo and Alberto Gilardino, 2 each (2009 and 2013)

Others
 Most appearances at the Central European International Cup
 Giuseppe Meazza, 16
 Most appearances at the Olympics
 Adolfo Baloncieri, 11
 Most appearances as a substitute
 Alessandro Del Piero, 30
 Most appearances as a substitute at the FIFA World Cup
 Alessandro Del Piero, 7
 Most appearances as a substitute at the UEFA European Championship
 Alessandro Del Piero, 6
 Most appearances for Italy wearing the number 10 shirt
 Giancarlo Antognoni
 Most FIFA World Cup matches won
 Paolo Maldini, 14

Age
 Oldest player
 Dino Zoff, 41 years 89 days, 29 May 1983, 0–2 vs. Sweden
 Youngest player
 Renzo De Vecchi, 16 years 112 days, 26 May 1910, 6–1 vs. Hungary
 Youngest outfield player to feature in a match post-World War II
 Simone Pafundi, 16 years 242 days, 16 November 2022, 3–1 vs. Albania
 Youngest unofficial player to feature in a match
 Rodolfo Gavinelli, 16 years 98 days, 9 April 1911, 2–2 vs. France
 Youngest forward to start in a match
 Eugenio Mosso, 18 years 238 days, 5 April 1914, 1–1 vs. Switzerland
 Youngest unofficial forward to start in a match
 Rodolfo Gavinelli, 16 years 98 days, 9 April 1911, 2–2 vs. France
 Oldest debutant
 Emiliano Moretti, 33 years 160 days, 18 November 2014, 1–0 vs. Albania
 Oldest player to feature at the FIFA World Cup
 Dino Zoff, 40 years 133 days, 11 July 1982, 3–1 vs. West Germany
 Youngest player to feature at the FIFA World Cup
 Giuseppe Bergomi, 18 years 195 days, 5 July 1982, 3–2 vs. Brazil
 Oldest player to feature at a FIFA World Cup Final
 Dino Zoff, 40 years 133 days, 11 July 1982, 3–1 vs. West Germany
 Youngest player to feature at a FIFA World Cup Final
 Giuseppe Bergomi, 18 years 201 days, 11 July 1982, 3–1 vs. West Germany
 Oldest player to feature at the UEFA European Championship
 Giorgio Chiellini, 36 years and 331 days, 11 July  2021, 1–1 (3–2) vs. England
 Oldest player to feature at a UEFA European Championship Final
 Giorgio Chiellini, 36 years and 331 days, 11 July  2021, 1–1 (3–2) vs. England
 Youngest goalkeeper to feature in a match
 Gianluigi Donnarumma, 17 years 189 days, 1 September 2016, 1–3 vs. France
 Youngest goalkeeper to start a match
 Gianluigi Donnarumma, 18 years 31 days, 28 March 2017, 2–1 vs. Netherlands
 Most FIFA World Cup titles
 Giovanni Ferrari, Giuseppe Meazza, Eraldo Monzeglio, 2 each (1934 and 1938)
 Most Central European International Cup titles
 Giuseppe Meazza, Eraldo Monzeglio and Alfredo Pitto, 2 each (1927–30 and 1933–35)
 Only player to win both the FIFA World Cup and the UEFA European Championship
 Dino Zoff (1968 and 1982)
 Only players to win both the FIFA World Cup and the Olympic Gold Medal
 Sergio Bertoni, Alfredo Foni, Ugo Locatelli, Pietro Rava (1936 and 1938)
 Longest career
 Gianluigi Buffon, 29 October 1997–23 March 2018,

Goalscorers

 Most goals 
As of 20 November 2022, the players with the most goals for Italy are:

Players in bold are still active.

 First goal 
 Pietro Lana, 15 May 1910, 6–2 vs. France
 Most goals at the FIFA World Cup
 Christian Vieri, Paolo Rossi and Roberto Baggio, 9 each
 Most goals at a single FIFA World Cup
 Paolo Rossi (1982) and Salvatore Schillaci (1990), 6 each
 Most goals at the FIFA World Cup and FIFA World Cup qualifiers
 Gigi Riva, 17
 Most FIFA World Cups scored in
 Roberto Baggio (1990, 1994 and 1998), 3
 Most goals in FIFA World Cup qualifiers
 Gigi Riva, 14
 First goal in a FIFA World Cup match
 Angelo Schiavio, 27 May 1934, 7–1 vs. United States
 First goal in a FIFA World Cup qualifier match
 Anfilogino Guarisi, 25 March 1934, 4–0 vs. Greece
 Most goals at the UEFA European Championship
 Mario Balotelli and Antonio Cassano, 3 each
 Most goals at a single UEFA European Championship
 Mario Balotelli (2012), 3
 Most goals at the UEFA European Championship and the UEFA European Championship qualifying
 Filippo Inzaghi, 14
 Most goals in UEFA European Championship qualifying
 Filippo Inzaghi, 12
 First goal in a UEFA European Championship match
 Angelo Domenghini, 8 June 1968, 1–1 vs. Yugoslavia
 First goal in a UEFA European Championship qualifying match
 Gianni Rivera, 2 December 1962, 6–0 vs. Turkey
 Most goals at the UEFA Nations League
 Lorenzo Pellegrini, 4
 Most goals at the FIFA Confederations Cup
 Mario Balotelli, Giuseppe Rossi and Daniele De Rossi, 2 each
 Most goals at a single FIFA Confederations Cup
 Mario Balotelli (2013) and Giuseppe Rossi (2009), 2 each
 First goal in a FIFA Confederations Cup match
 Giuseppe Rossi, 15 June 2009, 3–1 vs. United States
 Most goals at the Central European International Cup
 Giuseppe Meazza, 8
 First goal in a Central European International Cup match
 Julio Libonatti, 23 October 1927, 2–2 vs. Czechoslovakia
 Most goals at the Olympics
 Adolfo Baloncieri, 8
 First goal in an Olympic match
 Franco Bontadini, 29 June 1912, 2–3 vs. Finland
 Most goals in Friendlies
 Giuseppe Meazza, 20
 Fastest goal
 Emanuele Giaccherini, 19 seconds, 11 June 2013, 2–2 vs. Haiti
 Fastest goal at the FIFA World Cup
 Pietro Ferraris, 5 June 1938, 2–1 vs. Norway, and Bruno Mora, 7 June 1962, 3–0 vs. Switzerland, both in the 2nd minute of play
 Fastest goal by a substitute at the UEFA European Championship
 Alessandro Altobelli, 17 June 1988, 2–0 vs. Denmark, after 1 minute
 Oldest goalscorer
 Fabio Quagliarella, 36 years 54 days, 26 March 2019, 6–0 vs. Liechtenstein
 Youngest goalscorer
 Wilfried Gnonto, 18 years 222 days, 14 June 2022, 2–5 vs. Germany
 Oldest goalscorer in a competitive match
 Fabio Quagliarella, 36 years 54 days, 26 March 2019, 6–0 vs. Liechtenstein
 Youngest goalscorer in a competitive match
 Wilfried Gnonto, 18 years 222 days, 14 June 2022, 2–5 vs. Germany
 Oldest goalscorer at the FIFA World Cup
 Daniele Massaro, 33 years 36 days, 28 June 1994, 1–1 vs. Mexico
 Youngest goalscorer at the FIFA World Cup
 Giacomo Bulgarelli, 21 years 226 days, 7 June 1962, 3–0 vs. Switzerland
 Youngest goalscorer in a UEFA European Championship Final
 Pietro Anastasi, 20 years 64 days, 10 June 1968, 2–0 vs. Yugoslavia
 Oldest goalscorer at the UEFA European Championship
 Christian Panucci, 35 years 62 days, 13 June 2008, 1–1 vs. Romania
 Oldest goalscorer in a UEFA European Championship final
 Leonardo Bonucci, 34 years 71 days, 11 July 2021, 1–1 vs. England
 Oldest goalscorer in a UEFA European Championship qualifying match
 Fabio Quagliarella, 36 years 54 days, 26 March 2019, 6–0 vs. Liechtenstein
 Youngest goalscorer in a UEFA European Championship qualifying match
 Moise Kean, 19 years 23 days, 23 March 2019, 2–0 vs. Finland
 Youngest player to score a brace
 Bruno Nicolè, 18 years 258 days, 9 November 1958, 2–2 vs. France
 Youngest player to score a brace in a competitive match
 Gianni Rivera, 19 years 206 days, 2 December 1962, 6–0 vs. Turkey
 Youngest player to score a brace in a UEFA European Championship qualifying match
 Gianni Rivera, 19 years 206 days, 2 December 1962, 6–0 vs. Turkey
 Most goals by a midfielder
 Adolfo Baloncieri, 25
 Most goals by a midfielder  post-World War II
 Daniele De Rossi, 21
 Most goals by a defender
 Antonio Cabrini, 9
 Most goals from a penalty kick
 Roberto Baggio, 7
 Most goals from a penalty kick at the FIFA World Cup
 Roberto Baggio, 2
 Most goals from a penalty kick at the UEFA European Championship
 Leonardo Bonucci, Filippo Inzaghi and Andrea Pirlo, 1 each
 Most goals from a penalty kick in a single match
 Alessandro Del Piero, 2, 11 October 2000, 2–0 vs. Georgia
 Most goals in penalty shoot-outs
 Franco Baresi and Andrea Pirlo, 3 each
 Most goals as a substitute
 Enrico Chiesa and Alessandro Del Piero, 5 each
 Most goals as a substitute at the FIFA World Cup
 Alessandro Del Piero and Gianni Rivera, 2 each
 Most goals as a substitute at the UEFA European Championship
 Alessandro Altobelli, Mario Balotelli, Federico Chiesa, Luigi De Agostini, Antonio Di Natale and Matteo Pessina, 1 each
 Most own goals
 Sandro Salvadore, 2
 Most own goals at the FIFA World Cup
 Cristian Zaccardo, 1, 17 June 2006, 1–1 vs. United States
 Italy's 100th goal at the FIFA World Cup finals
 Luigi Di Biagio, 17 June 1998, 3–0 vs. Cameroon

Hat-tricks
 Three goals or more in a single match on the greatest number of occasions
 Gigi Riva, 3 times
 Most hat-tricks at a FIFA World Cup
 Angelo Schiavio, 27 May 1934, 7–1 vs. United States, and Paolo Rossi, 5 July 1982, 3–2 vs. Brazil, 1 each

As of 31 May 2017

Scores and results list Italy's goal tally first.

Goalkeeping
 Most clean sheets
 Gianluigi Buffon, 77
 Fewest goals conceded in a single FIFA World Cup by a starting FIFA World Cup winning goalkeeper
 Gianluigi Buffon (2006), 2
 Most clean sheets in a single FIFA World Cup
 Gianluigi Buffon (2006) and Walter Zenga (1990), 5 each
 Most clean sheets at the FIFA World Cup
 Gianluigi Buffon, 6
 Most clean sheets at the UEFA European Championship
 Gianluigi Buffon, 8
 Most clean sheets at the FIFA Confederations Cup
 Gianluigi Buffon, 1
 Most clean sheets in the Central European International Cup
 Gianpiero Combi, 4
 Most clean sheets at the Summer Olympics
 Giovanni De Prà and Bruno Venturini, 2 each
 Most clean sheets in FIFA World Cup qualifying matches
 Gianluigi Buffon, 21
 Most clean sheets in UEFA European Championship qualifying matches
 Gianluigi Buffon, 23
 Most clean sheets in friendlies
 Dino Zoff, 27
 Longest unbeaten streak
 Dino Zoff, 1,142 minutes
 Longest unbeaten streak at the FIFA World Cup
 Walter Zenga, 518 minutes
 Most consecutive clean sheets at the FIFA World Cup
 Walter Zenga, 5
 Longest unbeaten streak at the UEFA European Championship
 Dino Zoff, 494 minutes
 Longest unbeaten streak in UEFA European Championship qualifying matches
 Gianluigi Buffon, 644 minutes
 Longest unbeaten streak in UEFA European Championship and UEFA European Championship qualifying matches
 Dino Zoff, 784 minutes (including 8 consecutive clean sheets, 1975–80)
 Fewest goals conceded in a single UEFA European Championship by a starting UEFA European Championship winning goalkeeper
 Dino Zoff (1968), 1
 Most penalty kicks saved (not including shoot-outs)
 Gianluigi Buffon, 5
 Most penalty kicks saved at the FIFA World Cup (not including shoot-outs)
 Gianluigi Buffon, 1
 Most penalty kicks saved at the UEFA European Championship (not including shoot-outs)
 Gianluigi Buffon and Francesco Toldo, 1 each
 Most penalty kicks saved in UEFA European Championship penalty shoot-outs
 Gianluigi Buffon and Gianluigi Donnarumma, 3 each
 Most penalty kicks saved in a single UEFA European Championship penalty shoot-out
 Francesco Toldo and Gianluigi Donnarumma, 2 each

Captains

 First captain
 Francesco Calì, 15 May 1910, 6–2 vs. France
 Youngest captain
 Bruno Nicolè, 21 years 61 days, 25 April 1961, 3–2 vs. Northern Ireland
 Most appearances as captain
 Gianluigi Buffon, 80
Most appearances as captain as a goalkeeper
 Gianluigi Buffon, 80
Most appearances as captain at the UEFA European Championship
 Gianluigi Buffon, 13 (2008–2016)
Longest serving captain
 Giacinto Facchetti, 1966–1977

List of captaincy periods of the various captains throughout the years.

 1910 Francesco Calì
 1911–1913 Giuseppe Milano
 1914–1915 Virgilio Fossati
 1920–1925 Renzo De Vecchi
 1925–1927 Luigi Cevenini
 1927–1930 Adolfo Baloncieri
 1931–1933 Umberto Caligaris
 1934 Gianpiero Combi
 1935–1936 Luigi Allemandi
 1937–1939 Giuseppe Meazza
 1940–1947 Silvio Piola
 1947–1949 Valentino Mazzola
 1949–1950 Riccardo Carapellese
 1951–1952 Carlo Annovazzi
 1952–1960 Giampiero Boniperti
 1961–1962 Lorenzo Buffon
 1962–1963 Cesare Maldini
 1963–1966 Sandro Salvadore
 1966–1977 Giacinto Facchetti
 1977–1983 Dino Zoff
 1984–1985 Marco Tardelli
 1985–1986 Gaetano Scirea
 1986–1987 Antonio Cabrini
 1988–1991 Giuseppe Bergomi
 1991–1994 Franco Baresi
 1994–2002 Paolo Maldini
 2002–2010 Fabio Cannavaro
 2010–2018 Gianluigi Buffon
 2018–2022 Giorgio Chiellini
 2022–present Leonardo Bonucci

Discipline

 Most red cards
 Giancarlo Antognoni, Leonardo Bonucci, Franco Causio and Daniele De Rossi, 2 each
 First goalkeeper to be sent off at a FIFA World Cup
 Gianluca Pagliuca, 1, 23 June 1994, 1–0 vs Norway

Managers
 Most manager appearances
 Enzo Bearzot, 104
 Most FIFA World Cups coached in
 Enzo Bearzot, 3
 Most FIFA World Cup appearances as a manager
 Enzo Bearzot, 18
 Most FIFA World Cup matches won as a manager
 Enzo Bearzot, 9
 Most FIFA World Cup titles as a manager
 Vittorio Pozzo, 2 (1934 and 1938)

Team records
 Venue most played in
 Stadio Olimpico, 53
 Largest victory
 10–0 vs. United States, 4 April 1975
 Largest official victory
 9–0 vs. United States, 2 August 1948
 Largest FIFA World Cup victory
 7–1 vs. United States, 27 May 1934
 Largest UEFA European Championship victory
 3–0 vs. Turkey, 11 June 2021 and Switzerland, 16 June 2021
 Largest defeat
 1–7 vs. Hungary, 6 April 1924
 Largest FIFA World Cup defeat
 1–4 vs. Switzerland, 23 June 1954 and Brazil, 21 June 1970
 Largest UEFA European Championship defeat
 0–4 vs. Spain, 1 July 2012
 Most total goals in a single match
 11–3 vs. Egypt, 9 June 1928
 Most goals scored in a single match
 11–3 vs. Egypt, 9 June 1928
 Most goals conceded in a single match
 1–7 vs. Hungary, 6 April 1924
 Most goals scored in a single edition of the World Cup
 12, 1982 and 2006
 Most goals scored in a single edition of the European Championship
 13, 2020
 Most goals scored in a single edition of a major international tournament
 13, Euro 2020
 Most consecutive victories
 13, 11 November 2020 vs. Estonia – 2 July 2021 vs. Belgium
 Most consecutive victories without conceding a goal
 11, 11 November 2020 vs. Estonia – 20 June 2021 vs. Wales
 Most consecutive away victories
 6, 14 October 2018 vs. Poland – 15 November 2019 vs. Bosnia and Herzegovina
 Most consecutive defeats
 3, achieved twice, most recently 23 June 1974 vs. Poland – 20 November 1974 vs. Netherlands
 Most consecutive matches without victory
 8, 15 January 1958 vs. Northern Ireland – 29 November 1959 vs. Hungary
 Most consecutive matches without defeat
 37,  10 October 2018 vs. Ukraine – 8 September 2021 vs. Lithuania
 Most consecutive draws
 5, 8 June 1997 vs. Brazil – 29 October 1997 vs. Russia
 Most consecutive matches without a draw
 20, achieved twice, most recently 22 November 1975 vs. Netherlands – 25 January 1978 vs. Spain
 Most consecutive matches with at least one goal scored
 43, 20 May 1931 vs. Scotland – 31 October 1937 vs. Switzerland
 Most consecutive matches with at least two goals scored
 10, 23 March 2019 vs. Finland – 18 November 2019 vs. Armenia; 11 November 2020 vs. Estonia – 16 June 2021 vs. Switzerland
 Most consecutive matches with no goals scored
 3, achieved five times, most recently 10 November 2017 vs. Sweden – 23 March 2018 vs. Argentina
 Most consecutive matches with at least one goal conceded
 18, 31 January 1915 vs. Switzerland – 1 January 1923 vs. Germany
 Most consecutive matches with no goals conceded
 12, 7 October 1972 vs. Luxembourg – 8 June 1974 vs. Austria
 Most minutes without conceding a goal
 1,168
 Most consecutive victories in a UEFA European Championship qualifying and final tournaments
 15, 2020
 Most victories in a single UEFA European Championship qualifying and final tournaments
 15, 2020  
 Most consecutive victories in a single UEFA European Championship final tournament
 5, 2020  
 Most victories in a single UEFA European Championship final tournament
 5 (out of 7), 2020
 Most victories in a single UEFA European Championship qualifying group
 10 (out of 10), UEFA Euro 2020 qualifying
 Highest percentage of victories in one calendar year
 100%, 2019 (10 out of 10) 
 Most victories in one calendar year
 12, 2021 (out of 17)
 Most players scoring in a single match
 7, 18 November 2019 vs. Armenia

Notes

References

External links
All-time records at 11v11.com

 
National association football team records and statistics